Someone's Wife in the Boat of Someone's Husband is a 2013 Korean-Indonesian drama film directed by Edwin. Edwin co-wrote the screenplay with poet Seno Gumira Ajidarma based on Ajidarma's Cinta di Atas Perahu Cadik.

Plot 
Mar believes in the mysterious legend of the lovers Halimah and Sukab in the island of Sawai a hundred years ago. She journeys to Sawai to feel what Halimah once felt, hoping to find Sukab there.

Cast 

 Nicholas Saputra as Sukab
 Mariana Renata as Mar

Production 
Filming took place in Jakarta as well as Ambon and Masohi in Maluku. The project was a co-production by Babibuta Film and the Jeonju Digital Project.

Release 
It was released on 26 April 2013 at the Jeonju International Film Festival in South Korea as part of a project titled Strangers alongside Strangers When We Met, directed by Masahiro Kobayashi and Over There directed by Zhang Lü.

References

External links
 

2013 films
2013 drama films
Indonesian drama films